Jalan Bandar Sibu, or Jalan Oya and Jalan Tunku Abdul Rahman, Federal Route 33, is a federal road in Sibu Division, Sarawak, Malaysia. It is also a main route to Sibu city from Pan Borneo Highway.

List of junctions

Malaysian Federal Roads